was a private junior college in Fukuchi, Kyoto, Japan, established in 1950. The predecessor of the school was founded in 1941. The present name was adopted in 1956. Discontinued in 2017.

External links
 Official website 

Japanese junior colleges
Educational institutions established in 1941
Private universities and colleges in Japan
Universities and colleges in Kyoto Prefecture
1941 establishments in Japan

ja:京都短期大学